Doto iugula is a species of sea slug, a nudibranch, a marine gastropod mollusc in the family Dotidae.

Distribution
This species was described from Manzanillo on the Caribbean coast of Costa Rica.

Description
This nudibranch is very transparent, crystalline, with a medio-dorsal band of irregular orange spots. The cerata are transparent and the ceratal tubercles have no dark spots. The cerata have a conspicuous, orange, irregular patch near the apex. There are no pseudobranchs but just a few irregular tubercles on the inner faces of the cerata.

EcologyDoto iugula'' was not found associated with any food source.

References

Dotidae
Gastropods described in 2001